Pig Iron – The Album is a compilation album by English punk rock band Anti-Nowhere League. It consists of a newly remastered copy of their Scum album along with their Pig Iron EP and three new tracks.

The song "Gypsys, Tramps & Thieves" was originally recorded by Cher.

Track listing
"Pig Iron"
"Scum"
"Burn 'em All"
"Gypsies Tramps and Thieves"
"How Does It Feel?"
"Get Ready"
"Suicide..Have You Tried?"
"The Great Unwashed"
"Long Live Punk"
"Fucked Up & Wasted"
"Chocolate Soldiers"
"Talk Dirty To Me"
"Judges and Whores"
"London Boys"
"Let The Country Feed You"
"The Landlord"
"The Adventures of Peter Vile"
"The Day the World Turned Gay"

Personnel
Nick Kulmer – vocals
Jez – guitars
Shady – bass
Djahanshah Aghssa – drums

Anti-Nowhere League albums
2006 compilation albums